Staircase House (30/30a Market Place) is a Grade II* listed medieval building dating from around 1460 situated in Stockport, historically in Cheshire, now within Greater Manchester, England. The house is famous for its rare Jacobean cage newel staircase. An audio guide recounts the full history of the house.

History
Staircase House,, is in its origins a cruck timber building, with its earliest known surviving timbers dating from 1459 to 1460 on the basis of dendrochronology. Very little is known of the property's early history, though it is thought that it may have been the home of William Dodge who, in 1483, was the Mayor of Stockport.

The first residents of whom there is certainty were the Shallcross family who owned the House from 1605 to 1730. Members of the landed gentry, with their seat just across the county boundary, in Derbyshire, it was they who in 1618 installed the distinctive Jacobean cage newel staircase, from which the house takes its modern name. The staircase has some unusual features, such as the carving covering much of the woodwork.

The characteristic of a cage newel staircase, after which it is named, is that each of its newel posts extends throughout the full height of the staircase, the four posts and the banisters thus forming a stairwell which is not fully enclosed, but rather contained within a cage-like structure. In fact, at Staircase House, at some date before the first surviving descriptions of the staircase in the 19th century, the newel posts were each sawn through, just below the stringer board and just above the handrail. That may have been done as a response to changing tastes, or possibly to overcome the practical difficulties of moving large objects, such as furniture, about the house.

In its later years in private ownership, the House was used partly as the Staircase Café until 1989, and into the 1990s as storage for Gardner's Green Grocery and Fruit stall which stood in the market, immediately in front of the House itself.

The House, including the staircase, was painstaking restored using traditional materials, tools and techniques, following a major fire in 1995, the second of two arson attacks on the semi-derelict building. The restoration was undertaken by Stockport Metropolitan Borough Council, after having compulsorily purchased the property, following a long and persistent campaign to save it by a local conservation group, the Stockport Heritage Trust, beginning in 1987.

The Trust, local volunteers, argued that the House was a unique survival and should be preserved and, on that basis, it dissuaded the council from demolishing the building as a dangerous structure as had been previously proposed. Stockport Heritage Trust financed tree-ring dating establishing the date of the earliest remaining parts of the House as 1460. They commissioned the first measured architectural survey of the building and were successful in pressing for it to be upgraded officially from a Grade 2 to a Grade 2* listed building.

Now open to the public, Staircase House offers a unique glimpse into the life of mediæval and renaissance Stockport, the origins of the town, its status as a borough and a market town, and the subsequent stages of the House's development until the 1940s, when it was last used as a private dwelling.

See also

Grade II* listed buildings in Greater Manchester
Listed buildings in Stockport

References

External links

  - Official site at Stockport Metropolitan Borough Council

Buildings and structures in Stockport
Grade II* listed buildings in Greater Manchester
Houses in Greater Manchester
Historic house museums in Greater Manchester
Tourist attractions in the Metropolitan Borough of Stockport